Andrei Hugo Cherny (born August 4, 1975) is an American lawyer, author, former government official, and the founder and President of Democracy: A Journal of Ideas. Cherny served as the CEO of Aspiration, Inc., a financial firm based in Marina del Rey, California, from 2013 to October 2022.

Early life and education
Cherny was born in Los Angeles, on August 4, 1975. His parents, Helena and Pavel, were Czechoslovak Jewish immigrants who initially spoke little English.

After graduating from North Hollywood High School, Cherny graduated with honors from Harvard College. He later received his Juris Doctor from the UC Berkeley School of Law with support from The Paul & Daisy Soros Fellowships for New Americans.

Career
As a writer for The Harvard Crimson, he wrote political pieces highlighting Clinton's reelection campaign. The White House communications director noticed his column and circulated it until it finally reached President Clinton's desk. Clinton used several of Cherny's lines in his 1997 inaugural address and hired the twenty-one-year-old Cherny ten days later. Cherny was the youngest White House speechwriter in American history. President Clinton has called him a “critical part of the team” which brought about the economic successes of the 1990s.

Cherny then went on to be an advisor to other elected officials and business leaders. He has provided policy and strategic advice to Barack Obama, Joe Biden, Al Gore, Hillary Clinton, John Kerry, and the top executives of companies such as Microsoft and Intel.

Cherny is the co-founder and President of Democracy, a public policy journal.

He was the chief drafter and lead negotiator of the 2000 Democratic Party platform when Al Gore was the nominee for president.

Cherny was the Director of Speechwriting and Special Advisor on Policy for the John Kerry 2004 presidential campaign. He was credited with the new strategy that revised Kerry's faltering primary candidacy and helped win him the Democratic nomination.

Cherny was a visiting fellow at the Belfer Center for Science and International Affairs in 2004. In 2011, he was a Senior Fellow at the Center for American Progress.

From 2006 to 2009, Cherny served as a criminal prosecutor and Arizona Assistant Attorney General.

Cherny co-founded Aspiration, Inc., an online financial company, with Joseph Sanberg in 2013. Aspiration enables customers to choose their own fee levels on checking and investment accounts, and offers managed funds that are 100% fossil-fuel free.

He is also the author of The Next Deal: The Future of Public Life in the Information Age, and The Candy Bombers: The Untold Story of the Berlin Airlift and America's Finest Hour.

Political campaigns
At the age of 26, while a law student, Cherny ran for the California State Assembly, losing to Lloyd E. Levine.

In 2010, Cherny was the Democratic Party nominee for State Treasurer of Arizona. He lost the election to Republican Doug Ducey, receiving 41% of the vote in a four-way race.

Cherny served as Chairman of the Arizona Democratic Party from January 22, 2011 through January 30, 2012.

In 2012, Cherny lost the Democratic primary for Arizona's 9th congressional district.

References

Further reading
 Video Interview/Discussion with Cherny and David Frum on Bloggingheads.tv

External links
 
 AndreiForArizona.com, campaign website
 Andrei Cherny on The Huffington Post
 Interview on The Candy Bomber's at the Pritzker Military Museum & Library on September 25, 2008

1975 births
21st-century American historians
21st-century American Jews
21st-century American male writers
American chief executives of financial services companies
American male non-fiction writers
American people of Czech-Jewish descent
American political scientists
American speechwriters
Arizona Democrats
Arizona Democratic Party chairs
Living people
Harvard College alumni
Historians from California
Jewish American historians
Jewish American people in Arizona politics
North Hollywood High School alumni
Politicians from Los Angeles
Politicians from Phoenix, Arizona
UC Berkeley School of Law alumni